In the 1994–95 season Panathinaikos played for 36th consecutive time in Greece's top division, the Alpha Ethniki. They also competed in the UEFA Cup Winners' Cup and the Greek Cup.

Squad

Competitions

Alpha Ethniki

Classification

Greek Cup

Final

Cup Winners' Cup

First round

Second round

References

External links
 Panathinaikos FC official website

Panathinaikos F.C. seasons
Panathinaikos
Greek football championship-winning seasons